This is a list of Serbian musicians.

Musicians
 Ernest Ačkun, clarinetist. Slovene-born.
 Đorđe Balašević
 Isidor Bajić
 Radmila Bakočević
 Petar Bergamo
 Stanislav Binički
 Dejan Bogdanović
 Dušan Bogdanović
 Emina Jahović
 Maja Bogdanović
 Bruno Brun
 Biserka Cvejić
 Miroslav Čangalović
 Izudin Čavrković
 Oskar Danon
 Dejan Despić
 Uroš Dojčinović
 Denise Djokic
 Philippe Djokic
 Zoran Erić
 Marija Gluvakov
 Duško Gojković
 Dragutin Gostuški
 Stevan Hristić
 Ivan Jevtić
 Petar Konjović
 Petar Krstić
 Radomir Mihailović Točak
 Alex Lifeson
 Ljubica Marić
 Stefan Milenković
 Miloš Mihajlović
 Božidar Milošević
 Milan Mladenović
 Vasilije Mokranjac
 Marko Nešić (born 1872)
 Marko Nešić (born 1976)
 Olivera Vojna Nešić
 Jasmina Novokmet
 Aleksandar Obradović
 Tatjana Olujić
 Alexander Petrovich (Alex The Yeti Bones)
 Miloš Raičković
 Josif Runjanin
 Marija Šerifović
 Verica Šerifović
 Kornelije Stanković
 Kornelije Kovač
 Margita Stefanović
 Milenko Stefanović
 Sanja Stijačić
 Jovan Šajnović
 Miroslav Tadić
 Marko Tajčević
 Vladimir Tošić
 Sabrina Vlashkalic
 Mihajlo Vukdragović
 Svetlana Stević Vukosavljević
 Alexander Zonjic
 Živojin Zdravković
 Bojan Zulfikarpašić

Composers

 Aleksandar Simić
 Petar Stojanović
 Rudolf Brucci. Croatian-born

Singers

Male singers
 Miroslav Ilić (born 1950), folk singer
 David Bižić, opera singer
 Zdravko Čolić (born 1951), pop singer, one of the most popular artists of former Yugoslavia. Bosnian-born.
 Đorđe Balašević, pop-rock musician

Female singers
 Fahreta Živojinović, known as Lepa Brena, pop-folk singer, one of the most popular singer of former Yugoslavia. Bosnian-born.

Musicians
Serbian